Changes in Star Wars re-releases vary from minor differences in color timing, audio mixing, and take choices to major insertions of new visual effects, additions of characters and dialogue, scene expansions, and replacement of original cast members with newer ones. Though changes were also made to the prequel trilogy, the original trilogy saw the most alteration. Dissatisfied with the original theatrical cuts of the original Star Wars film, The Empire Strikes Back, and Return of the Jedi, creator George Lucas altered the films in ways that were ostensibly not initially possible, primarily due to limitations of time, budget, and technology.

The first substantial changes were made in 1997 with the release of a Special Edition remaster in commemoration of the franchise's twentieth anniversary. These changes were largely made as visual effects tests for the forthcoming prequel films, demonstrating the possibilities of computer-generated imagery (CGI). Additional notable changes were made when the original trilogy was released on DVD in 2004, in an attempt to create more consistency with the prequel trilogy. More changes were made to the films for their Blu-ray release in 2011 and for their 4K Ultra HD release in 2019.

Although some critics felt that many smaller changes were improvements, innocuous, or understandable, most larger changes were received negatively by fans and critics—particularly those made to the original trilogy, which has never been released in its unaltered form in high definition.

Background
Prior to making Star Wars, franchise creator George Lucas experienced dissatisfaction with the re-editing by studios of both of the films he had directed. His first feature, THX 1138 (1971), had five minutes removed by Warner Bros. Universal Pictures had his subsequent film, American Graffiti (1973), edited to remove several minutes.

Following the success of Star Wars, in 1977, Lucas's original version of THX 1138 was theatrically released. The restored cut of American Graffiti was released theatrically in 1978; this was altered for 1998 DVD with a computer-generated (CGI) change to the opening shot. In 2004, Lucas supervised a director's cut of THX 1138, restoring the picture while adding some modern special effects.

As a proponent of artist's moral rights and having endured alterations to his works made by studios without his consent, Lucas was one of many filmmakers who spoke before the U.S. House of Representatives in 1988 against the ongoing colorization of black-and-white films by studios.

Release history
 1977: In May, Star Wars was theatrically released. Three different audio versions (a Dolby Stereo mix, a six-channel mix for 70 mm screenings, and a mono mix print) were created, with significant differences. Later that year, among others, a silent, English-subtitled Super 8 reel version of the film was released by Ken Films.
 1980: In May, The Empire Strikes Back was theatrically released. After its initial opening, but before its wide release, Lucas extended the end sequence. A 70 mm print of the film differed from the more widely distributed 35 mm print in takes of dialogue, visual and sound effects, shot choices, and transitions between shots; none of these changes appeared in later releases, with exception of one dialogue change.
 1981: In April, Star Wars was re-released, with the addition of the subtitles "Episode IV" and "A New Hope" added to the opening crawl.
 1983: In May, Return of the Jedi was theatrically released.
 1985: The original Star Wars film was re-released on VHS, LaserDisc, and Capacitance Electronic Disc (CED) with an improved audio mix. The LaserDisc and CED sped the film up by 3% to fit onto a single disc.
 1993: The original trilogy was released on LaserDisc as "The Definitive Collection". With the exception of a new THX audio mix, scratch and dirt removal, and color balance changes, it matched the original theatrical releases.
 1995: The original trilogy was re-released on VHS with THX audio, advertised as the final release of the theatrical versions.

 1997: The "Special Edition" of the original trilogy was released theatrically from January through March for the 20th anniversary of Star Wars. This release featured the first significant changes, which were intended to prove that Industrial Light & Magic could effectively produce CGI visual effects for the prequel trilogy.
 1999: In May, Episode I – The Phantom Menace was theatrically released.
 2001: In November, The Phantom Menace was released on DVD, which features a slightly extended cut from the theatrical release.
 2002: In May, Episode II – Attack of the Clones was theatrically released. A version made for digital-projection theaters included a few special effects which were not ready for the initial wide release; the DVD features the digital version with some extended lines of dialogue. A version was also made for IMAX theaters using IMAX's then-new digital-remastering process, which saw the film's running time reduced to 120 minutes due to IMAX film platter limitations at the time, as well as the aspect ratio being cropped to 1.81:1.
 2004: In September, the original trilogy was released on DVD. Further significant alterations were made, including replacing Latin script text with Aurebesh.
 2005: Episode III – Revenge of the Sith was theatrically released. The DVD release features a minor editing change.
These match the 1993 LaserDisc release, but remove the subtitles Episode IV – A New Hope.
 2011: The original and prequel trilogy were released on Blu-ray. Alterations were made to all six films.
 2012: The Phantom Menace was theatrically re-released in 3D, with a minor change to one shot.
 2015: The original and prequel films were released as a digital download. They are identical to their Blu-ray release, except for changes to the opening logos and fanfares. The U.S. Library of Congress made the original release of Star Wars available to watch in person. The sequel trilogy film The Force Awakens was theatrically released in both standard and IMAX formats.
 2019: The original and prequel films were released in 4K resolution and HDR on Disney's streaming service, Disney+. Color, compositing, and minor effects adjustments were made to all three films of the original trilogy.

Significant changes

Star Wars

Title change
The first film was released in 1977 under the title Star Wars. The subtitle Episode IVA New Hope was retroactively added to the opening crawl in a subsequent release. Lucasfilm dates the addition to the theatrical re-release on April 10, 1981. This change was made to bring the original film in line with the titling of its sequel, Star Wars: Episode V – The Empire Strikes Back (1980).

Tatooine
Some scenes on Tatooine were modified for the 1997 Special Edition, most notably an alteration to the Greedo scene and the restoration of a deleted scene featuring Jabba the Hutt. Two newly filmed shots of stormtroopers and CGI dewbacks were inserted before a shot in which the static creature in the background was replaced with moving CGI. Other modifications introduced in various releases include a CGI replacement of the Jawa sandcrawler, a different sound effect for Obi-Wan Kenobi making a krayt dragon call to scare off the Tusken Raiders, the addition of rocks in front of the cave R2-D2 hides in, the replacement of an external shot of Obi-Wan's hut with a new angle showing Luke Skywalker's parked landspeeder, and color and continuity changes involving the binary sunset. The shadow of the landspeeder was redone in one shot, and creatures, robots, and ships were added to Mos Eisley, including elements created for the Shadows of the Empire multimedia campaign. Some of the aliens in the cantina were replaced with new CGI designs, and a shot of the Millennium Falcon fighting its way out of Mos Eisley was added.

Greedo scene

Han Solo (Harrison Ford) is cornered in the Mos Eisley cantina by the Rodian bounty hunter Greedo (Paul Blake), and Han shoots under the table to kill Greedo. The 1997 release of the film alters the scene so that Greedo shoots first and misses (with Han's head digitally pivoted away from the laser blast). The scene was changed again for the 2004 DVD release of the film so that Han and Greedo shoot almost simultaneously; this was shortened by several frames for the 2011 Blu-ray. The scene was further modified for the 2019 4K Ultra HD release with the addition of a close-up shot of Greedo speaking (without subtitles), the removal of a reverse shot of Greedo, and a re-rendering of the visual effects.

The original version of the Greedo scene is considered iconic, while the altered version is one of the most controversial changes to the film. Fans have coined the phrase "Han shot first" to protest the change, which according to Polygon alters Han's moral ambiguity and his fundamental character. Lucas has stated that he always intended for Greedo to shoot first. In 2015, a replica of an early script for Star Wars was discovered in the archives of the University of New Brunswick library. In the script, dated March 15, 1976, only Han shoots.

Jabba the Hutt 
The original script for Star Wars included a scene between Han and Jabba the Hutt, set in a Mos Eisley docking bay. The scene was filmed by a second unit with Declan Mulholland wearing a furry vest as a stand-in for Jabba. Lucas intended to replace Mulholland in post-production with a stop-motion character, but due to time limitations and budget constraints, the scene was cut. In the 1997 edition, the scene was reinserted with a CGI Jabba replacing Mulholland. This marks an early example of a fully CGI character with dialogue to appear in a film, preceding the introduction of Jar Jar Binks in The Phantom Menace by two years.

In the original footage, Ford walked through the area where Jabba's tail would be. As a workaround, Han was digitally moved to appear as if he steps on Jabba's tail, with the Hutt squealing as a result; this has been poorly received, including by its original animator. Several Rodians (at least one of whom is a look-alike of Greedo) appear in the background. Boba Fett was also added to the end of the scene, and seems to break the fourth wall.

The insertion of this scene into the film was criticized for being superfluous to the previous cantina scene with Greedo, slowing down the pacing without moving the plot forward, and undermining the reveal of the Millennium Falcon in the next scene as well as Jabba's original debut in Return of the Jedi. The 1997 CGI Jabba has been described as "atrocious", and for the 2004 DVD release was replaced with a higher-fidelity model resembling his CGI appearance in The Phantom Menace. On the 2004 audio commentary for A New Hope, Lucas reflected that while he did not mind cutting the scene when he was not sure if he would make sequels, he subsequently wanted it to be included as it introduces a character important to Han's story arc. ScreenCrush later reflected that the 2004 version "was an improvement, but only in the way that nausea is an improvement over vomit".

Luke's lightsaber
During the training scene aboard the Millennium Falcon, Luke's lightsaber—which in some releases had erroneously appeared green—was corrected to blue in the 2011 release.

Death Star
For the Special Edition, a scene of Han chasing a squad of stormtroopers on the Death Star was altered to replace several stormtroopers at the end of the corridor with dozens in formation. Den of Geek criticized the change as being "too much" and making Han's shooting back at them less believable. Two ScreenRant writers call the updated version "utterly ridiculous" but "much funnier". Another shot of a stormtrooper hitting his head on a door had a sound effect added in 2004, making it seem like the goof was intentional.

In the original version of Obi-Wan and Darth Vader's duel, Obi-Wan's saber appeared to "short out" when foreshortened toward the camera (a result of the in-camera effects failing to account for this viewing angle). A glow was added in 2004, and a fully finished blade was added to these shots in 2019. Also in the 2019 version, Obi-Wan's lightsaber was adjusted to appear consistently blue, and the flash effects of the lightsabers clashing was redone.

Both the explosions of Alderaan and the Death Star had shockwaves added to them starting with the 1997 edition.

Yavin 4
The Special Edition of A New Hope incorporated a deleted scene on Yavin 4, in which Luke is briefly reunited with his childhood friend Biggs Darklighter. This was felt by some to strengthen the relationship of the characters during the climactic Death Star attack run.

The original film includes a two-shot sequence of X-wing fighters flying past Yavin towards the Death Star (showing the fighters from behind, then the front). For the 1997 edition, these were replaced with a 180° turn of CGI  (seen from the front, then the back). Wired points out that the addition of the moon (Yavin 4) in the background places it "very clearly in range of the Death Star from the very beginning of the battle." Additionally, engine sounds were added to the battle scene which make parts of the musical score difficult to hear.

The Empire Strikes Back

Hoth
Close-up shots of the wampa that captures Luke on Hoth were inserted.

The Emperor's hologram
For his appearance as a hologram in The Empire Strikes Back, the Emperor was originally portrayed by an actress wearing a mask and a male voice actor. For the 2004 DVD edition and subsequent releases, this was replaced by new footage of Ian McDiarmid, who plays the character in later films. The dialogue was changed in the new version, making Vader seem to have been unaware of Luke's paternity despite knowing his last name.

ScreenCrush argues that this change is the worst to any Star Wars film, owing to the altered dialogue. Wired writes that it is unclear whether the new dialogue is meant to portray Vader and the Emperor "deliberately testing one another", and also that McDiarmid "looks more like he did 20 years before in the timeline than he does a year later in Return of the Jedi". Sources such as Polygon and io9 regard the actor replacement itself as logical,
and ScreenRant praises it as "a change that blends seamlessly with the original film, due in large part to the relative ease of swapping one holographic image for another".

Boba Fett
Boba Fett's dialogue in the film was originally recorded by Jason Wingreen. Subsequently, Attack of the Clones revealed Boba to be a clone of Jango Fett, played by Temuera Morrison. To reflect this, Morrison re-recorded Wingreen's lines for the 2004 edition of the film.

In the shot when the Millennium Falcon detaches from the Star Destroyer, Boba Fett's ship, the Slave I, was replaced with a CGI version following the Falcon more closely. Both WhatCulture and Wired opine that the change makes it hard to believe that Han could not see Fett.

Cloud City
New establishing shots were added to Cloud City, which according to Lucas were added partially because director Irvin Kershner was dissatisfied with the limitations of the location's set. The additions create some inconsistencies with later shots. Another shot has a railing added to it, which does not reflect properly. New shots of Cloud City's citizens reacting to Lando Calrissian's evacuation orders were also added.

In the 1997 edition, the scene of Luke dropping down the chute to escape Vader was modified to include an audible scream—created using the sound of the Emperor screaming as he falls down the shaft in Return of the Jedi; this received criticism and was removed in later releases.

Ending 
Following the initial limited theatrical release, Lucas added three exterior shots to the denouement to clarify that Lando and Chewbacca are on the Falcon, not the Rebel frigate that Luke, Leia, and the droids are on.

In the 1997 edition, a line of Vader's dialogue was replaced and a shot of his shuttle landing in his Star Destroyer (using stock footage of the second Death Star from Return of the Jedi) was inserted into the sequence in which Luke uses the Force to contact Leia. Wired calls this "Yet another addition that answers a question no one had."

Return of the Jedi

Jabba's palace
In the Special Edition, an establishing shot of a bantha herd was inserted, and a CGI beak and extra tentacles were added to the sarlacc. Jabba's dialogue is given subtitles, although  translates most of his lines. The 2011 edition extended the front door of Jabba's palace, making the door appear three times longer from the outside than it does on the inside. The Blu-ray also added a Dug to the inside of the palace, which was criticized as standing out from puppet aliens in the same scene.

The scene in which Jabba feeds the dancer Oola to his rancor opens with a performance by the Max Rebo Band and its lead singer, Sy Snootles. In the original theatrical release, the song is "Lapti Nek", sung in the fictional language Huttese. The Special Edition changed the performance to the new song "Jedi Rocks", which mostly received negative criticism. Polygons Owen Good describes the new vocals as difficult to listen to and having "the volume and vocal fry of a higher pitched Tina Turner but none of the soul". The puppet used for Snootles was also replaced with CGI. According to Special Edition producer Rick McCallum, this change was made because Lucas could not originally achieve the "large musical number" he envisioned because characters could not move in certain ways; Snootles could not open her mouth to lip sync correctly, and her eyes did not move. The Special Edition increased the size of the Max Rebo Band from three members to twelve. Additional footage was filmed of Boba Fett flirting with one of the dancers; original Fett actor Jeremy Bulloch thought this was somewhat contrary to the character's nature.

In the theatrical release of the film, Oola's death is filmed from outside the rancor pit: she falls into the pit, and her scream is heard from off-screen. In the 1997 edition, extra shots were inserted depicting her in the pit, including shots where she looks up to the crowd, the pit door being raised, and a shot of her terror. The rancor and Oola as she screams remain off-screen. Femi Taylor, who played Oola, impressed critics with her ability to reprise the role over a decade later without visible difference. Wired notes that "they put a different eyeshadow color on her, so she's not exactly seamless." James Whitbrook at io9 praised the additions to the scene, writing that it teased the rancor well while still keeping the monster a surprise for Luke's later battle with it. Conversely, Den of Geek UK criticized the additions as unnecessary and felt that they made the audience familiar with the pit, weakening Luke's scene.

In 2004, Lucas revealed that he had considered adding a shot of Fett escaping the sarlacc, but decided against it because it would have detracted from the scene's focus: Jabba's death. Fett's survival was eventually depicted in the Disney+ live-action streaming series The Mandalorian (2019–present) and The Book of Boba Fett (2021–2022).

Climax on the second Death Star

At the climax of the film, the Emperor tortures Luke with Force lightning, prompting Darth Vader to throw the Emperor down a chasm. In the original version of the scene, Vader has no dialogue. Starting with the 2011 edition, Vader mutters "No" and then yells a drawn-out "No!", creating a parallel with his near-identical cry at the end of Revenge of the Sith. This addition was described as being unnecessary at best, and at worst being clumsy, sounding terrible, and seeming to mock the scene in the prequel. A Polygon writer argues that the change displays a distrust in the audience's ability to interpret Vader's emotions and further that it made the emotional scene "laughable".

In the scene where Anakin Skywalker is unmasked, the 2004 edition digitally removed his eyebrows to reflect Anakin burning on Mustafar at the end of Revenge of the Sith. Actor Sebastian Shaw's brown eyes were also digitally changed to blue to match Hayden Christensen's eye color.

Victory celebration
The film ends with a scene of the Rebel Alliance and a village of Ewoks on Endor celebrating the death of the Emperor and victory over the Empire. The original theatrical release of the film featured the song "Ewok Celebration", also known as "Yub Nub", playing over the celebration. The 1997 edition release of the film replaced "Ewok Celebration" with score composed by John Williams titled "Victory Celebration", and the scene was lengthened to include shots of celebration on the planets Coruscant, Bespin, and Tatooine. The 2004 edition further added a shot set on Naboo, in which a Gungan is given a line of dialogue, and added the Senate building and Jedi Temple to Coruscant.

Anakin's Force spirit

At the end of the film, Darth Vader is redeemed by killing the Emperor to save Luke Skywalker's life, then dies of his injuries shortly after, and appears to Luke as Anakin Skywalker alongside the Force spirits of Yoda and Obi-Wan Kenobi. In the original version, Sebastian Shaw plays this Force spirit in addition to an unmasked Vader. Hayden Christensen later played Anakin in the prequel trilogy films Attack of the Clones and Revenge of the Sith. To reflect this, the 2004 edition of Return of the Jedi replaced Shaw's appearance as the Force spirit with Christensen. Some considered the change controversial, with Den of Geek rating it as the worst change to the original trilogy. The Digital Bits notes that the 2019 restoration made it more obvious where Anakin's head was replaced.

The Phantom Menace
The DVD released in 2001 features a longer cut of the podrace sequence, as well as a brief scene on Coruscant focusing on Anakin and Jar Jar Binks. The 2011 Blu-ray incorporates a CGI Yoda. For the 2012 3D re-release, the end of Anakin's magnetic wand was redesigned in one shot of the podrace.

Podrace sequence 
The extended podrace includes a longer introduction of the racers and the second lap of the race, which ScreenRant says does not contribute to the story, and potentially negatively affects the film's pacing. Additionally, shots including Watto cheering for Anakin's rival Sebulba were removed for home media releases.

CGI Yoda

In the original version of The Phantom Menace, a puppet was used to portray Yoda except in two wide shots which required CGI. This was changed for the 2011 release, with the puppet being replaced with a CGI model, similar to those used for the film's sequels, Attack of the Clones and Revenge of the Sith.

Attack of the Clones 
A few special effects which were not ready for the initial wide release were completed for release in digital-projection theaters. The DVD features the digital version with some extended lines of dialogue. The 2011 edition features a small editing change to the Coruscant speeder chase, adds a voiceover to Anakin's vision of Shmi, and changes the order of shots depicting Count Dooku's escape.

Revenge of the Sith 
The theatrical release had a diagonal wipe from Obi-Wan leaving Mustafar to Anakin using his hand to crawl from the lava. The DVD changed this to a direct cut, which was reverted on the Blu-ray. The latter release also has additional clone trooper dialogue as they land on Utapau, and added moss to the treehouse on Kashyyyk.

Reception 

Various media outlets have called attention to the changes deemed the most offensive and condemned them. These include: in A New Hope, making Greedo shoot first and the restored Jabba scene; in The Empire Strikes Back, changes to the Emperor's dialogue; in Return of the Jedi, the new song in Jabba's palace, Vader yelling "No!" at the climax, and Christensen replacing Shaw as Anakin's spirit.

In 2015, Lance Ulanoff of Mashable viewed the original theatrical print of Star Wars submitted to the Library of Congress, and noted merit to Lucas's belief that technology did not allow him to achieve his vision, citing a visible marquee around Leia's ship "so jarring that it temporarily pulls me out of the film" because the original print is "lack[ing] the seamless quality [he has] come to expect from sci-fi and fantasy". Despite this, Ulanoff wrote that he "hate[s] each and every one" of the later added CGI effects. In 2017, a writer argued that the Special Edition changes to the original Star Wars "stripped the film of every aspect that it had won its Academy Awards for", including those for Best Visual Effects, Best Production Design, and Best Original Score.

A smaller number of changes have been cited as an improvement. A 2015 Polygon article asserts that "there was a solid logic behind" a number of minor changes, such as adding windows to Cloud City or sparks to Jango Fett's jetpack, saying these "angered, to a close approximation, nobody". A New Hope's restored Biggs scene has garnered mostly favorable feedback. In 2021, ScreenRant praised special effects additions to A New Hope, including the CGI dewback replacement, the Mos Eisley establishing shots, and the explosions of Alderaan and the Death Star. In 2022, citing Lucas's opinion that the Special Edition had improved A New Hope from representing 60% of his vision to 80%, an io9 writer argued that the film could be further altered "to turn that 80% into 100%".

Legacy 
George Lucas' name is often used as a verb to mean making retroactive changes to films or TV series. In early 2002, filmmaker (and friend of Lucas) Steven Spielberg re-released E.T. the Extra-Terrestrial in a digitally altered 20th-anniversary Special Edition, which notably replaced guns carried by federal agents with walkie-talkies. This prompted the creators of South Park to parody both Spielberg and Lucas's changes to their films in an episode of their show. Other adult animation series and stand-up comedians have targeted retroactive changes to Star Wars, including Family Guy, which in 2007 lampooned Christensen's snippy appearance as a spirit, and Brian Posehn, who argued in his 2017 special that the original trilogy "already was special".

Lucas's changes have come to be cited as a primary point of reference for retroactive changes to other films. By contrast, some media outlets positively reviewed the 2020 4K release of Peter Jackson's The Lord of the Rings trilogy, which was remastered and adjusted for color consistency with The Hobbit trilogy, but not otherwise significantly altered.

Asked why he was opposed to releasing the original versions of the films alongside the modified versions, Lucas stated in 2004: "To me, [the original movie] doesn't really exist anymore. ... I'm sorry you saw half a completed film and fell in love with it. But I want it to be the way I want it to be." In addition to a number of extant continuity errors throughout the films, a CGI character omission in The Phantom Menace has never been corrected—despite special effects supervisor John Knoll calling attention to it in the film's 2001 DVD commentary. ScreenRant says this "highlights how George Lucas' motivations for tweaking the Star Wars movies are more about improving and updating than removing imperfections." We Got This Covered similarly argues that "Lucas wasn't in the business of actually tweaking the experience by enhancing visual fidelity; he mostly used those versions to tweak certain things in the narrative."

In 2011, young Anakin actor Jake Lloyd stated that, according to Star Wars prequel sound editor Matthew Wood, there was a six-hour cut of The Phantom Menace that was "mind-blowingly awesome".

In 2019, Kathleen Kennedy, president of Lucasfilm since the 2012 acquisition of the company by Disney, stated that she would not make alterations to Lucas's original trilogy, because "those will always remain his." While promoting The Rise of Skywalker, director J. J. Abrams expressed his hopes that the original versions of the trilogy would be officially released, but said that the powers that be had told him "that that's not necessarily possible". On whether he thought the sequel trilogy should be altered at some point, Abrams stated, "I respect anyone who feels like they want to go back and adjust and add; I get that. But I also feel like ... [when] you're done with a thing, ... that's what it is." Contrarily, some media outlets have called for the climax of The Rise of Skywalker to be altered to show the Force spirits of the Jedi who aid Rey. Fan pleas for a director's cut of the film trended on social media following the release of Zack Snyder's Justice League.

Some sources have incorrectly claimed the existence of other alternate versions of the films. In 2020, a YouTube clip purported to show an audience reaction to The Empire Strikes Backs twist ending, adding "Luke" to Vader's famous "I am your father" line—a common false memory of the dialogue. Additionally, in May 2021, The Rise of Skywalker was misbelieved to have been color corrected on Disney+ to reduce its green hue, apparently due to confusion over whether Night Shift software was active. Following the release of many Marvel Cinematic Universe films in the IMAX format on Disney+, SlashGear suggested that The Force Awakens's IMAX version could be released in the future.

In early 2023, InsideTheMagic.com reported that some fans were disappointed that Lucasfilm had apparently chosen to ignore a fan theory (seeded and endorsed by Lucasfilm Animation creative head Dave Filoni) regarding clone trooper Captain Rex appearing in Return of the Jedi as a Rebel soldier, suggesting that the film could be modified to canonize this premise. We Got This Covered reported that there was increased fan interest in a "definitive edition" of the films to improve dated visual effects.

In 2023, when asked if he had the clout to influence Lucasfilm to release the original cuts of the original trilogy, The Mandalorian creator Jon Favreau answered, "Do you think anybody but ... the people who grew up with it ... would care?" He went on to explain his view that "younger people have a whole different perception of what Star Wars is." Contrarily, a Giant Freakin Robot article argues that fans "have been begging for a high-definition version of the pre-Special Edition Star Wars trilogy for years".

Notes

References

External links
 
 
 
 Online archive of Star Wars coverage at American Cinematographer, including interviews regarding the 1997 edition

Changes
Star Wars